The Alder Hey organs scandal involved the unauthorised removal, retention, and disposal of human tissue, including children’s organs, during the period 1986 to 1996. During this period organs were retained in more than 2,000 pots containing body parts from around 850 infants. These were later uncovered at Alder Hey Children's Hospital, Liverpool, during a public inquiry into the organ retention scandal.

The scandal led to the Human Tissue Act 2004, which overhauled legislation regarding the handling of human tissues in the UK and created the Human Tissue Authority.

History 

Until a public inquiry in 1999, the general public was unaware that Alder Hey and other hospitals within the National Health Service (NHS) were retaining patients' organs without family consent.

The inquiry was sparked by the death of 11-month-old Samantha Rickard, who died in 1992 while undergoing open-heart surgery at Bristol Royal Infirmary (BRI). In 1996, four years after Samantha's death, her mother Helen Rickard learned of the allegations of excessive mortality rates for children's heart surgery at the BRI. Rickard demanded a copy of her infant daughter's medical records from the hospital and found a letter from the pathologist who performed the post-mortem to her surgeon, stating that he had retained Samantha's heart. Confronted with this evidence, the hospital promptly returned the heart in 1997. Rickard quit her job in order to find out exactly what had happened to her daughter; she set up a support group with other parents and ran a free phone helpline to cater to the many other families affected as well.

A Bristol Heart Children Action Group was set up, and the group embarked on discussions with the hospital to find out how much human material had been kept from children who had died after cardiac surgery. In February 1999, the Action Group members called a press conference so that the public could learn about the retained hearts. In the meantime, serious doubts about the quality of paediatric cardiac surgery at Bristol led to the formation of a Public Inquiry, chaired by Ian Kennedy. In September 1999 a medical witness to the Inquiry drew attention to the large number of hearts held at the Alder Hey Children's Hospital in Liverpool.

As the details of Alder Hey's organ retention began to come to light the public learned that the programme went back decades. An investigation was opened in December 1999 bringing to light the fact that Alder Hey was not the only Liverpool hospital affected; Walton Hospital had stored the organs of 700 patients.

In January 2001, the official Alder Hey report (also known as the Redfern Report) was published. A large scale public outcry against the National Health Service resulted when it was revealed that Dutch pathologist Dick van Velzen had systematically ordered the "unethical and illegal stripping of every organ from every child who had had a postmortem" during his time at the hospital. This was ordered even for the children of parents who specifically stated that they did not want a full post-mortem. The report also revealed that over 100,000 organs, body parts and entire bodies of fetuses and still-born babies were stored in 210 NHS facilities. Additionally 480,600 samples of tissue taken from dead patients were also being held. Later that year the General Medical Council (GMC) ruled that van Velzen should be temporarily banned from practising medicine in the UK.

Furthermore, it emerged that Birmingham Children's Hospital and Alder Hey Children's Hospital in Liverpool had also given thymus glands, removed from live children during heart surgery, to a pharmaceutical company for research in return for financial donations. Alder Hey also stored without consent 1,500 fetuses that were miscarried, stillborn or aborted.

Early 2003 saw the Alder Hey claims by families of victims being settled for an out-of-court settlement of £5 million, a sum equivalent to about £5000 for each child.

In January 2004, more than 2,000 families filed suit against the NHS with the High Court for removing the body parts of dead patients, including children, without consent.

Starting on 5 August 2004, the bodies of 50 nameless babies stored for medical research at Liverpool hospitals were buried at Allerton Cemetery. Alder Hey accounted for 7 of the unnamed while the rest came from other hospitals. More funerals followed on the Thursday of each week for several months to come. Over 1,000 unidentified bodies, most of them fetuses less than 28 weeks old, were buried during this time.

By December 2004, the Crown Prosecution Service (CPS) decided that there should be no prosecution of Dick van Velzen for criminal offences. The reason given for this decision was that there could be no guarantee that organs which remained in the containers were those originally taken at post mortem examination. This caused a problem for the prosecution, who were required to prove beyond a reasonable doubt that the organs were indeed illegitimately obtained. The police attempted to find a solution to this problem, but were unable to do so.

In 2004, all charges against van Velzen were dropped, because doing so would have required proof of which organs belong to specific children. On Monday 20 June 2005, the GMC ruled that van Velzen would be permanently banned from practising medicine in the UK.

Redfern Report primary findings

Primary conclusions of the Redfern report 

Professor Dick van Velzen ordered unethical and illegal retention of all children's organs when he took up post in 1988 and falsified records and postmortem reports. He failed to catalogue organs and took away medical records when he left
Alder Hey and Liverpool University knew there were risks in appointing Professor Van Velzen but failed to supervise him
They failed to monitor his work or follow up complaints and missed numerous chances to discipline him. Close scrutiny of his work would have revealed unethical organ retention, but it never happened

Recommendations of Redfern report and chief medical officer 

Independent commission to oversee cataloguing and return of 105,000 organs retained by hospitals in England
New legislation on informed consent - The Human Tissue Act 2004
Review of coroner's system
Trusts to employ bereavement counsellor
Review by the education secretary of arrangements for joint hospital/university posts

Alder Hey scandal timeline 

April 1988 - Section committee at Alder Hey appoints Dick van Velzen as chair of fetal and infant pathology.

September 1988 - Dick van Velzen assumes his post as chair at Alder Hey.

1992 - Samantha Rickard dies while undergoing open-heart surgery  at the Bristol Royal Infirmary.

December 1994 - Dick van Velzen is restricted to fetal and perinatal work only. On hearing this he takes an unauthorized leave from Alder Hey.

February 1995 - Dick van Velzen is ordered to stop any research project without proper ethical approval

December 1995 - Dick van Velzen leaves Alder Hey and begins work at IWK Grace Hospital in Nova Scotia

1996 - Helen Rickard demands a copy of her medical records from the BRI and finds a letter stating Samantha's heart had been retained

1998 - Van Velzen is fired from Halifax's IWK Hospital.

February 1999 - the Action Group members call a press conference to inform the public about the retained hearts at BRI.

September 1999 - A medical witness at the BRI inquiry draws attention to the large number of hearts held at the Alder Hey Children's Hospital in Liverpool.

December 1999 - An investigation is opened resulting in the Redfern report.

September 2000 - A worker at a storage facility in Halifax, Nova Scotia, finds the organs of an 8-year-old girl in a plastic bag.

2001 - GMC rules that Dutch pathologist Dick van Velzen should be temporarily banned from practising medicine in the UK.

30 January 2001 - Redfern report released.

4 February 2001 - Prosecutors in Halifax, Nova Scotia, indicate that they are prepared to ask for the extradition of Prof Dick van Velzen relating to the discovery of children's organs in heat-sealed bags at a rented warehouse.

July 2001 – Van Velzen is convicted of improperly storing body parts removed from a child in the Halifax case. He was given a 12 months of probation and ordered to pay $2,000 (Canadian) to charity.

Early 2003 - Alder Hey claims settled with families of the victims for an out-of-court settlement of £5million.

January 2004 - 2,000+ families file suit against the NHS with the High Court for removing the body parts of dead patients without consent.

5 August 2004 - Start of unidentified body burials at Allerton cemetery.

5 December 2004 - The Crown Prosecution Service decides there should be no prosecution of Prof Dick Van Velzen for criminal offences.

20 June 2005 - General Medical Council rules that Dutch pathologist Dick van Velzen should be banned from practising medicine permanently in the UK.

Notes

References

External links 

Public inquiries in the United Kingdom
Medical scandals in the United Kingdom
1980s in England
1990s in England
Organ transplantation in the United Kingdom
Hospital scandals
1980s in Liverpool
1990s in Liverpool